Esken Renewables (Formally Stobart Biomass Holdings Ltd trading as Stobart Energy and formerly Stobart Biomass) is the largest supplier of biomass fuel in the United Kingdom. Esken Renewables comes under the Energy division of Esken.

History

The original company
On 24 March 2010, the Stobart Group announced the purchase of 50% of A. W. Jenkinson Biomass Ltd, from A. W. Jenkinson Forest Products, for £30 million, as an equal mix of cash and shares. A. W. Jenkinson Biomass Ltd was then renamed Stobart Biomass Products Ltd. Stobart Biomass transports sustainable wood products for use in low-carbon emission power plants, producing electricity at both large and small scale power plants, including for export. The Stobart Group announced in 2011 that it was buying the remaining 50% of Stobart Biomass Products it did not already own for £20 million.

Esken Renewables (Formally Stobart Energy) 
Following Stobart Group's partial realisation of its Transport and Distribution division, Stobart Group decided to invest £55 million of the proceeds to expand its Biomass division into Green Energy, thus changing the division's name to Stobart Energy in the process.

Operations
Esken Renewables is the UK's largest supplier of biomass fuel. The company operates six wood management sites supplying 2 million tonnes of biomass per year via 135 walking floor trailers.

Esken Renewables operates six processing and storage sites (one with its own port facilities) and two other port operations and a drying facility to receive waste wood from across the UK.

See also
 Esken

References

External links
 Esken Renewables official website

2010 establishments in England